North Eastern Province (originally North-Eastern Province) was an electorate of the Victorian Legislative Council. It was created in the redistribution of provinces in 1882 when the original provinces of Central and Eastern Provinces were abolished. The new North Eastern, North Central, Melbourne East, Melbourne North, Melbourne South and Melbourne West Provinces were then created.

North Eastern Province was created and defined by the Legislative Council Act 1881 (taking effect from the 1882 elections) as consisting of the following divisions: Chiltern, Rutherglen, North Ovens, Beechworth, Bright, Oxley, Benalla, Euroa, Yarrawonga, Shepparton, Mansfield, Howqua, Goulburn and Seymour .

North Eastern Province was abolished at the 2006 state election in the wake of the Bracks Labor government's reform of the Legislative Council.

Members for North Eastern Province
Three members initially, two after the 1904 redistribution of provinces, Melbourne East Province and others were created.

Election results

References

Former electoral provinces of Victoria (Australia)
1882 establishments in Australia
2006 disestablishments in Australia